The Reunion Tour is a concert tour by Armenian American rock band System of a Down, celebrating the band's reunion, after going on hiatus in 2006.

Background
Following several weeks of internet rumors, the reunion of the band was officially announced on November 29, 2010, when several European festival dates in June 2011 were announced. Later, the band confirmed a show in Moscow, Russia on June 21, 2011. More European dates were later announced, with several North American headlining dates for May 2011 being announced on March 1, 2011. On March 21, 2011, the band announced a concert in Irvine, California, on May 25, 2011.

On February 9, 2011, Shavo Odadjian posted on his Twitter profile: "Just finished up our first rehearsal in 5 years. Amazing! !! I love my band."

On April 7, 2011, SOAD commented on their official website: "We want to know which songs you most want to hear on the road this summer. As a reward for telling us your top 6 setlist requests, one winner from each tour city will win a pair of tickets to his/her local show. They will also win a setlist from the show they attended, signed by all of us." On April 19, 2011, posted this: "For each date of the upcoming SOAD North American and EU Headline Tour, we are auctioning a pair of tickets, plus a personal lunch with John Dolmayan. All proceeds will benefit Music For Relief's Earthquake and Tsunami Relief efforts in Japan. [...] In addition, John will be auctioning off his personal drum kit at the end of the tour. The kit will be autographed by John and a collection of other noted drummers... More details coming soon."

On May 6, 2011, the band confirmed a show in Brazil, Rock in Rio Festival, on October 2, 2011, and in July, the band announced four headline shows in Latin America, with one more show in Brazil, and one in Mexico, Argentina and Chile.

On May 14, 2011, The Pulse of Radio, made an interview with the band's drummer John Dolmayan. He was said about the band's five-year hiatus, "I personally don't like breaks - I like to continue playing. But it was nice to go off and be John Dolmayan, as opposed to John from System, for a while. I think everybody had similar feelings."

Asked in October 2011 whether System of a Down will record a new album, drummer John Dolmayan replied, "We're gonna take it day by day. We still have a few more shows to do in South America — we're playing in Buenos Aires and we're playing Santiago, so we're looking forward to that. And then we're gonna go home. We don't generally work during Christmas and New Year's — that's a time for our family and stuff — so we'll be home for the next three or four months. And then Serj takes off and goes to New Zealand for a couple of months — he lives part time in New Zealand. And then I think he's got another solo album coming out next summer. So you might see System touring next summer, you might not. But for the people who are waiting for an album — I know there's a lot of people waiting for an album; I'm waiting for an album just like they are. It's gonna happen when it's right and when we can make something that tops what we've done in the past. Because we don't really wanna rest on our laurels — where what you've done in the past is what you depend on. Well, I don't wanna do that, and I know the rest of the guys don't wanna do that. Instead of resting on our laurels, we wanna throw them away and create something new and specific for this generation that they can say that's their System of a Down."

System of a Down was going to be one of the headliners for 2012's Soundwave festival. This was the first visit in Australia in seven years. Besides the Soundwave festival dates, the band was play three headlining shows in Oceania. The band was headlining the 2012's Heavy MTL Festival in Montreal and Heavy T.O. Festival in Toronto.

On April 23, 2012, System of a Down announced a slate of North American tour dates with special guest, Deftones.

The band played on the 2013's Kubana Festival in Russia, the Getaway Rock Festival in Sweden, the Jurassic Rock Festival in Finland, the Aerodrome Festival in Prague, the Frequency Festival in Austria, the Rock 'N' Heim and Rock im Pott Festivals in Germany, the Rock en Seine in Paris, the Reading and Leeds Festivals in the UK and also play in Poland, the Netherlands and Italy in August.

On November 10, 2014, System of a Down announced that they will be headlining Night One of KROQ's Almost Acoustic Christmas on December 13, 2014 at the Los Angeles Forum.

On November 17, 2014, they announced two more headlining shows: the Olympisky Stadium in Moscow, Russia on April 20, 2015 and the Rock in Rio festival in Rio de Janeiro, Brazil on September 24, 2015.

Tour dates

 1^ Headline dates, non Soundwave Festival appearance.

Set list

Formation
Daron Malakian - guitars, vocals
Serj Tankian - lead vocals, keyboards, guitars
Shavo Odadjian - bass guitar, backing vocals
John Dolmayan - drums

Support acts

 Gogol Bordello (May 10–25, 2011)
 Anti-Flag (June 2, 2011)
 Danzig (June 2, 2011)
 Sick of It All (June 2, 2011)
 Volbeat (June 2, 2011)
 ...And You Will Know Us by the Trail of Dead (June 6, 2011)
 Clutch (June 8, 2011)
 Dredg (June 15, 2011)
 Yokozuna (September 28, 2011)

 Macaco Bong (October 1, 2011)
 Cabezones (October 5, 2011)
 Libra (October 7, 2011)
 The Dillinger Escape Plan (February 22, 28 and 29, 2012)
 Deftones (August 2–15, 2012 and August 27, 2013)
 Palms (July 29, 2013)
 Hawk Eyes (August 13 and 20, 21, 2013)
 Lacuna Coil (August 27, 2013)

References

2011 concert tours
2012 concert tours
2013 concert tours
2014 concert tours
2015 concert tours
Reunion concert tours
System of a Down concert tours